This is a list of schools in Egypt dedicated to the study of Law.

Alexandria Governorate
 Alexandria University: Faculty of Law located in Alexandria
 Pharos University in Alexandria: Faculty of Legal Studies and International Relations located in Alexandria

Asyut Governorate
 Al-Azhar University: Faculty of Sharia and Law - Asyut Branch  located in Asyut
 Assiut University located in Asyut

Beni Suef Governorate
 Beni-Suef University: Faculty of Law located in Beni Suef

Cairo Governorate
 Ain Shams University: Faculty of Law  located in Cairo
 The British University in Egypt: Faculty of Law with dual certificates (British and Egyptian )  at El Sherouk City, Cairo 
 The American University in Cairo: School of Global Affairs and Public Policy located in Cairo

Dakahlia Governorate
 Mansoura University: Faculty of Law located in Mansoura

Gharbia Governorate
 Al-Azhar University: Faculty of Sharia and Law - Tanta Branch  located in Tanta
 Tanta University: Faculty of Law  located in Tanta

Giza Governorate
 Cairo University: Faculty of Law  located in Giza

Helwan Governorate
 Helwan University: Faculty of Law located in Helwan

Monufia Governorate
 Minufiya University located in Shibin El Kom

Qalyubia Governorate
 Banha University: Faculty of Law  located in Banha

Qena Governorate
 South Valley University: Faculty of Law located in Qena

Sharqia Governorate
 Zagazig University: Faculty of Law located in Zagazig

See also
 Education in Egypt
 List of universities in Egypt
 Lists of law schools

External links
 Supreme Council of Universities

Egypt
Education in Egypt
Egypt
Egypt